Acleris boscanoides is a species of moth of the family Tortricidae. It is found in Ukraine, Croatia, Bulgaria, North Macedonia, Greece, Turkey and the Near East.

The wingspan is 14–17 mm. Adults are on wing from January to April and from May to October.

The larvae feed on Ulmus species.

References

Moths described in 1959
boscanoides
Moths of Europe
Moths of Asia